John Wakeham, Baron Wakeham,  (born 22 June 1932) is a British businessman and Conservative Party politician. Between 1998 and 2012, he was chancellor of Brunel University, and since then has been its chancellor emeritus.

He was a director of Enron from 1994 until its bankruptcy in 2001.

Early life and education

Wakeham was educated at two independent schools in Surrey, Aldro School in Shackleford, and Charterhouse near Godalming. He became a successful accountant and later a businessman.

Political career
He stood unsuccessfully in Coventry East in 1966 and in Putney in 1970 before his election to the House of Commons at the February 1974 general election as the Member of Parliament (MP) for Maldon in Essex. He became a minister following Margaret Thatcher's victory in 1979.

During the late 1980s he served as Leader of the House of Commons, in which capacity he was responsible for the televising of Parliament, and as Energy Secretary (1989–92), where he drew up plans for the privatisation of electricity supply. Following a recommendation by John Major, he was created a life peer on 29 April 1992 taking the title Baron Wakeham, of Maldon in the County of Essex, serving as the Leader of the House of Lords until 1994.

He became chairman of the Press Complaints Commission in 1995, retiring in 2001. In 1997 he was appointed a Deputy lieutenant of Hampshire. Tony Blair appointed him in 1999 to head a Royal commission on reform of the House of Lords – the resulting Wakeham Report suggested a mainly-appointed Lords be maintained, with a small elected component.

Personal life
His first wife, Roberta, was killed in the Brighton hotel bombing in October 1984 and he was trapped in rubble for seven hours, suffering serious crush injuries to his legs. The couple had two children. Wakeham married his secretary, Alison Ward MBE, in 1985 and they have a son of their own. Before being Wakeham's secretary, Ward had been Margaret Thatcher's secretary.

Arms

References

External links
 
 
 
 Wakeham profile, apfn.org

1932 births
Living people
British Secretaries of State
Conservative Party (UK) life peers
Conservative Party (UK) MPs for English constituencies
Deputy Lieutenants of Hampshire
Enron people
Leaders of the House of Commons of the United Kingdom
Leaders of the House of Lords
Lord Presidents of the Council
Lords Privy Seal
Members of the Privy Council of the United Kingdom
People associated with Brunel University London
People educated at Aldro
People educated at Charterhouse School
Survivors of terrorist attacks
Alumni of Christ Church, Oxford
UK MPs 1974
UK MPs 1974–1979
UK MPs 1979–1983
UK MPs 1983–1987
UK MPs 1987–1992
Members of Parliament for Maldon
N M Rothschild & Sons people
Life peers created by Elizabeth II